Veerasit Puangnak (born 10 August 1966) is a Thai sailor. He competed in the Laser event at the 2000 Summer Olympics.

References

External links
 

1966 births
Living people
Veerasit Puangnak
Veerasit Puangnak
Sailors at the 2000 Summer Olympics – Laser
Place of birth missing (living people)
Sailors at the 2002 Asian Games
Medalists at the 2002 Asian Games
Veerasit Puangnak
Asian Games medalists in sailing
Veerasit Puangnak